Emmones Idees (Greek: Έμμονες Ιδέες; English: Obsessive Ideas) is the thirteenth studio album by Greek artist, Katy Garbi. It was released on 15 October 2003 by Sony Music Greece and certified gold in a week, but after a month received platinum certification, selling over 50,000 units*. The first single "Na Pernas" and precursor to the album was released over one month prior to the release of the album, which itself was initially scheduled to be released in September, but it was delayed to October, containing many of her most successful songs like "Na Pernas", "Antres", "Esena Mono" and "Poso Tha 'Thela". "Ilios I Vrohi" is a cover of Youm Wara Youm, previously recorded and performed as a duet by Samira Said and Cheb Mami. It was available in two different versions: a standard 16-track version, and a "Limited Edition" packaged with a bonus DVD including Mia Kardias music videos along with biography, discography and photos. Giannis Doulamis with Dewar's whiskey, a main sponsor of the album, organized a big celebration for the presentation of Katy's new gold album (were sold more than 30,000 units in the first week of release alone) as well as the multi-platinum award for her previous albums.https://www.hellenicaworld.com/Greece/Person/gr/KaitiGarbi.htmlhttps://www.musiccorner.gr/news/events/03/garbi/

In 2003, platinum was the album whose sales exceeded 40,000 units.

Track listing

Notes

 There is a gap of 22 seconds between tracks 15 and 16. "Mia Nihta Akoma" last 3:13.
 "Zilia" was not listed on the back cover of the album.

Singles
The following singles were officially released to radio stations with music videos, except the songs "Antres" and "Ta Ripsokindina". The songs "Emmones Idees", "Stenahoriemai" and "Zilia" were not released as singles, but gained a lot of airplay."Na Pernas""Na Pernas" was the lead single and released on 5 September 2003 with music video. Some scenes was filmed at Thessaloniki's port. It gained massive radio airplay and making airplay every hour for a year."Poso Tha 'Thela""Poso Tha 'Thela" was the second single and released on 1 October 2003 with music video. The duet has a successful airplay until today."Antres""Antres" was the third single and released on 3 November 2003 having a lot of airplay."Esena Mono""Esena Mono" was the fourth single from the album and released on 3 December 2003 with music video which filmed at London with her husband, Dionisis. The original music was composed by Azerbaijani composer, Eldar Mansurov in 1988. The song had a massive success and is considered one of the most successful ballads of the decade."Ta Ripsokindina""Ta Ripsokindina" was the fifth single and released on 2 February 2004 having a good airplay."Apsiha Pragmata""Apsiha Pragmata" was the sixth single and released on 19 April 2004. The music video was directed by Victoria Vellopoulou, due to Katy's film concerts at the ODEON KOSMOPOLIS cinema in the fall of 2012 and released on 25 October 2015, 12 years after its release."Emmones Idees [Medley]"'''

"Emmones Idees [Medley]" was the seventh and last single and released on 9 June 2004 with music video. It is a mix of 3 songs of album ("Apopse, Thee Mou, Anapse T' Asteria", "Ta Ripsokindina", "De S' Agapaei") which were in the radio's choices.

 Credits 
Credits adapted from liner notes.

 Personnel 

 Dimitris Antoniou – guitars (tracks: 3, 12)
 Mohamend Arafa – percussion (tracks: 5)
 Giannis Bithikotsis – bouzouki, cura, baglama (tracks: 7)
 Victoria Chalkiti – backing vocals (tracks: 16)
 Panagiotis Charamis – bass (tracks: 7)
 Nikos Chatzopoulos – violin (tracks: 3, 12)
 Achilleas Diamantis – guitars (tracks: 7)
 Stratos Diamantis – orchestration, programming, keyboards (tracks: 6, 7)
 Dimos Emmanouel – backing vocals (tracks: 1)
 Konstantinos Emmanouel – backing vocals (tracks: 1)
 Galleon – orchestration, programming, keyboards (tracks: 10)
 Spiros Georgiou – orchestration, programming, keyboards (tracks: 1, 9, 11, 13, 15)
 Thanos Gkiouletzis – violin (tracks: 9, 15)
 Telis Kafkas – bass (tracks: 1, 4, 8, 9, 11, 13, 14, 15)
 Panos Kapiris – second vocal (tracks: 8, 14)
 Manolis Karantinis – bouzouki (tracks: 1, 11, 13) / cura, baglama (tracks: 1, 13) / lute (tracks: 15)
 Katerina Kiriakou – backing vocals (tracks: 1, 3, 6, 7, 12)
 Giannis Konstantinidis – guitars (tracks: 5)
 Spiros Kontakis – guitars (tracks: 2, 16)
 Dimitris Kontopoulos – orchestration, programming, keyboards (tracks: 2, 5, 16)
 Kostas Lainas – keyboards (tracks: 4, 8, 14)
 Giannis Lionakis – orchestration, programming, guitars (tracks: 4, 8, 14)
 Andreas Mouzakis – drums (tracks: 1, 11, 13, 15)
 Vasilis Nikolopoulos – drums (tracks: 7)
 Alex Panagi – backing vocals (tracks: 3, 6, 7, 12, 16)
 Christos Pertsinidis – guitars (tracks: 1, 9, 11, 13, 15)
 Marios Psimopoulos – orchestration, programming, keyboards (tracks: 12)
 Antonis Remos – second vocal (tracks: 4)
 Panagiotis Stergiou – bouzouki, baglama (tracks: 4, 8, 14)
 Nikos Terzis – orchestration, programming, keyboards (tracks: 3)
 Lakis Tsiatsiamis – drums (tracks: 4, 8, 14)

 Production 

 Aris Binis (Sofita studio) – sound engineer, mix engineer (tracks: 4, 8, 14)
 Giannis Doulamis – production manager
 Nikolas Georgiou – styling
 Giannis Ioannidis (Digital Press Hellas) – mastering
 Nikos Iosifidis (G studio) – sound engineer, mix engineer (tracks: 1, 9, 11, 13, 15)
 Kostas Kalimeris (Prism studio) – mix engineer (tracks: 2, 5, 10, 16)
 Dimitris Kontopoulos (Vox studio) – sound engineer (tracks: 2, 5, 10, 16)
 Lefteris Neromiliotis (Sofita studio) – sound engineer, mix engineer (tracks: 3, 4, 8, 12, 14)
 Vasilis Nikolopoulos (Power Music studio) – sound engineer, mix engineer (tracks: 6, 7)
 Petros Paraschis – art direction
 Christos Prentoulis – photographer
 Petros Siakavellas (Digital Press Hellas) – mastering
 Despina Triantafillidou – cover processing
 Stefanos Vasilakis – hair styling
 Manos Vynichakis – make up

 Charts Emmones Idees'' made its debut at number 1 on the 'Top 50 Greek Albums' charts by IFPI.

In a week, it was certified gold and later was certified platinum according to sales.

References 

2003 albums
Greek-language albums
Katy Garbi albums
Katy Garbi video albums
Sony Music Greece albums
2003 video albums